Hyderabad Sailing Week is an annual event of yacht regatta conducted at Hussain Sagar in Hyderabad, India. Founded in 1985 it is cited as country's top national regattas and the only Olympic class sports event in India.

References

External links
 "Calendar of Events" at Yachting Association of India

Yachting races
Recurring sporting events
Sport in Hyderabad, India
Sport in Telangana